Zopherus jourdani is a species of ironclad beetle found in Central America. It is found in Honduras, Costa Rica, El Salvador, Guatemala, Mexico, and Nicaragua, and has been collected every month of the year from a variety of altitudes ranging from 2500 to 9800 feet. The species plays dead when disturbed, which earned it the name "Durene Niño" in Costa Rica. It lives under the bark of trees, including the balsa and the pine.

Ability to go without food 
The ability of Z. jourdani to survive for extended periods of time without food is well-documented in several papers and journals; it is known as "Caméleon" in Guatemala because of this ability. In the 1877-'78 Annales de la Sociéte Entomologique de Belgique, such a demonstration is recorded on the July 6th meeting: “...Mr. J. Rodriguèz brought six examples from Guatemala, kept without food in a box during the since the month of April. Three arrived in Europe still alive.”()

Appearance 
Specimens of Z. jourdani have variable colouration; they are mottled black and white, but the amount of each colour present varies. Light forms from Costa Rica were described by Champion in 1874 as Z. costaricensis, which was synonymized nearly a century later in 1972. Based on measurements recorded by Charles Triplehorn, it is one of the largest species in the genus, Z. chilensis being the largest. Z. jourdani has a variable length of between 17.7 and 36 mm, and a width of 6.1–12 mm.

References

Zopheridae
Beetles described in 1849
Beetles of Central America